The Killer is an upcoming American neo-noir action thriller film directed by David Fincher and written by Andrew Kevin Walker, based on the French graphic novel series of the same title by Alexis Nolent. It stars Michael Fassbender, Charles Parnell, Arliss Howard, Sophie Charlotte, and Tilda Swinton.

Cast
 Michael Fassbender as Christian / The Killer
 Charles Parnell
 Arliss Howard
 Sophie Charlotte 
 Tilda Swinton

Production

Development
In November 2007, it was announced that David Fincher would be directing an adaptation of the Matz French comic book The Killer, with Allesandro Camon writing the script, Brad Pitt's Plan B Entertainment producing, and Paramount Pictures distributing. By February 2021, Fincher had taken the project to Netflix, where he had signed an overall deal, with Andrew Kevin Walker now writing the script and Michael Fassbender circling the lead role. By June, it was reported that Fincher was planning to begin filming in November 2021 in Paris, while the involvement of cinematographer Erik Messerschmidt was also confirmed. Tilda Swinton joined the cast in October.

Filming
Principal photography began in early November 2021 in Paris; filming was also expected to take place in New Orleans and the Dominican Republic. In January 2022, it was confirmed that filming would take place in St. Charles, Illinois in March for ten days. On March 28, 2022, it was announced that filming had wrapped.

Release
The Killer is expected to be released on Netflix on November 10, 2023. The release date was revealed in a preview of Netflix's 2023 film slate uploaded to YouTube on January 18, 2023.

References

External links
 

2023 drama films
2023 thriller films
2020s American films
2020s crime drama films
2020s crime thriller films
2020s serial killer films
2020s thriller drama films
2020s English-language films
American crime drama films
American crime thriller films
American neo-noir films
American serial killer films
American thriller drama films
English-language Netflix original films
Films about contract killing
Films based on French comics
Films directed by David Fincher
Films scored by Atticus Ross
Films scored by Trent Reznor
Films shot in the Dominican Republic
Films shot in Illinois
Films shot in New Orleans
Films shot in Paris
Films with screenplays by Andrew Kevin Walker
Live-action films based on comics
Upcoming English-language films
Upcoming Netflix original films